Calliclava is a genus of sea snails, marine gastropod mollusks in the family Drilliidae.

Species
Species within the genus Calliclava include:
 Calliclava aegina (Dall, 1919)
 Calliclava albolaqueata (Carpenter, 1865)
 Calliclava alcmene  (Dall, 1919)
 Calliclava craneana (Hertlein & Strong, 1951)
 Calliclava jaliscoensis McLean & Poorman, 1971
 Calliclava lucida McLean & Poorman, 1971
 Calliclava pallida (Sowerby I, 1834)
 Calliclava palmeri (Dall, 1919)
 Calliclava rhodina McLean & Poorman, 1971
 Calliclava subtilis McLean & Poorman, 1971
 Calliclava tobagoensis Fallon, 2016
 Calliclava vigorata Fallon, 2016

References

External links
 McLean, J.H. (1971) A revised classification of the family Turridae, with the proposal of new subfamilies, genera, and subgenera from the Eastern Pacific. The Veliger, 14, 114–130
 Fallon P.J. (2016). Taxonomic review of tropical western Atlantic shallow water Drilliidae (Mollusca: Gastropoda: Conoidea) including descriptions of 100 new species. Zootaxa. 4090(1): 1-363
 WMSDB - Worldwide Mollusc Species Data Base: family Drilliidae

 
Gastropod genera